Schistidium is a plant genus in the moss family Grimmiaceae.

Species
The Plant List and Tropicos recognise about 150 accepted species:

A
 Schistidium abrupticostatum  
 Schistidium absconditum  
 Schistidium agassizii  
 Schistidium alfredii  
 Schistidium ambiguum  
 Schistidium amblyophyllum  
 Schistidium andinum  
 Schistidium andreaeopsis  
 Schistidium angustissimum  
 Schistidium antarctici  
 Schistidium antipodum  
 Schistidium apocarpum  
 Schistidium atrichum  
 Schistidium atrofuscum  
 Schistidium australiense

B
 Schistidium bakalinii  
 Schistidium beckettianum  
 Schistidium boreale  
 Schistidium boschbergianum  
 Schistidium brunnescens  
 Schistidium bryhnii

C
 Schistidium caespiticium  
 Schistidium caffrum  
 Schistidium calycinum  
 Schistidium canadense  
 Schistidium canterburiense  
 Schistidium celatum  
 Schistidium chalubinskii  
 Schistidium chenii  
 Schistidium chocayae  
 Schistidium chrysoneurum  
 Schistidium chubutense  
 Schistidium ciliatum  
 Schistidium cinclidodonteum  
 Schistidium coloradense  
 Schistidium confertum  
 Schistidium confusum  
 Schistidium crassipilum  
 Schistidium crassithecium  
 Schistidium cribrodontium  
 Schistidium cryptocarpum  
 Schistidium cupulare  
 Schistidium cyathiforme

D
 Schistidium deceptionense  
 Schistidium deguchianum  
 Schistidium depile  
 Schistidium domingense  
 Schistidium dominiii  
 Schistidium donatii  
 Schistidium drummondii  
 Schistidium dupretii

E
 Schistidium echinatum  
 Schistidium elegantulum

F
 Schistidium falcatum  
 Schistidium fallax  
 Schistidium flaccidum  
 Schistidium flexicaule  
 Schistidium flexifolium  
 Schistidium flexipile  
 Schistidium floerkeanum  
 Schistidium foraminis-martini 
 Schistidium frahmianum  
 Schistidium frigidum  
 Schistidium frisvollianum  
 Schistidium fuliginosum

G
 Schistidium gracile  
 Schistidium gracillimum  
 Schistidium grande  
 Schistidium grandirete

H
 Schistidium halinae  
 Schistidium hedwigiaceum  
 Schistidium heterophyllum  
 Schistidium holmenianum  
 Schistidium hyalinocuspidatum

I
 Schistidium imberbe

K
 Schistidium konoi

L
 Schistidium laingii  
 Schistidium latifolium  
 Schistidium leptoneurum  
 Schistidium lewis-smithii  
 Schistidium liliputanum  
 Schistidium lorentzianum

M
 Schistidium macrotylum  
 Schistidium malacophyllum  
 Schistidium maoricum  
 Schistidium marginatum  
 Schistidium maritimum  
 Schistidium minimeperichaetiale  
 Schistidium mitchellii  
 Schistidium mucronatum  
 Schistidium muticum

N
 Schistidium nervosum  
 Schistidium nodulosum

O
 Schistidium oamaruense  
 Schistidium obscurum  
 Schistidium occidentale  
 Schistidium occultum  
 Schistidium olivaceum  
 Schistidium oranicum

P
 Schistidium pachyneurulum  
 Schistidium pacificum  
 Schistidium papillosum  
 Schistidium perichaetiale  
 Schistidium perplexum  
 Schistidium poeltii  
 Schistidium praemorsum  
 Schistidium pruinosum  
 Schistidium pseudorivulare  
 Schistidium pulchrum

R
 Schistidium readeri  
 Schistidium recurvum  
 Schistidium repens  
 Schistidium revisum  
 Schistidium riparium  
 Schistidium rivulare  
 Schistidium rivulariopsis  
 Schistidium robustum

S
 Schistidium saxatile  
 Schistidium scabrifolium  
 Schistidium scabripes  
 Schistidium scandicum  
 Schistidium searellii  
 Schistidium serratomucronatum  
 Schistidium sibiricum  
 Schistidium siluricum  
 Schistidium sinensiapocarpum  
 Schistidium singarense  
 Schistidium spinosum  
 Schistidium squamatulum  
 Schistidium steerei  
 Schistidium stirlingii  
 Schistidium streptophyllum  
 Schistidium strictum  
 Schistidium subconfertum  
 Schistidium subflaccidum  
 Schistidium subflexifolium  
 Schistidium subincurvum  
 Schistidium subjulaceum  
 Schistidium submuticum  
 Schistidium subpraemorsum  
 Schistidium subsessile  
 Schistidium succulentum  
 Schistidium syntrichiaceum

T
 Schistidium tenerrimum  
 Schistidium tenerum  
 Schistidium tenuinerve  
 Schistidium torquatum  
 Schistidium torreyanum  
 Schistidium trichodon  
 Schistidium triquetrum  
 Schistidium truncatoapocarpum  
 Schistidium turbinatum

U
 Schistidium urceolare  
 Schistidium urnulaceum

V
 Schistidium venetum

W
 Schistidium wrightii

Y
 Schistidium yaulense

References

Moss genera
Grimmiales
Taxa named by Philipp Bruch